Full Colors is the 21st album by the jazz fusion group Casiopea recorded and released in 1991. At the same time, the video work MOTION PICTURE FROM FULL COLORS was also released.

Track listing

Personnel
CASIOPEA are
Issei Noro - Electric guitar, Acoustic guitar
Minoru Mukaiya - Keyboards
Yoshihiro Naruse - Electric Bass, Fretless Bass
Masaaki Hiyama - Drums, Percussion

Guest musician(5,7,9) 
Gen Ogami(Orquesta de la Luz) - Timbales & Percussions
Carlos Kanno (Orquesta de la Luz) - Bongo & Percussions
Gen Date (Orquesta de la Luz) - Conga & Percussions

Production
Sound Produced - Casiopea
Recording & Mixing Engineers - Koji Sugimori
Assistant Engineers - Yuji Kuraishi, Masashi Kudo, Yasuo Nakajima, Katsumi Moriya, Kengo Katoh, Kazuyoshi Hirayama
Mastering Engineers - Tohru Kotetsu
Producer - Ryoichi Okuda
Director - Taketsune Kubo
Executive Producer - Kunihiko Otsuka
Supervisor - Tadashi Nomura
Artists Manager - Takashi E. Norway
Promotion Director - Hiroharu Sato, Toshiharu Kawatsuna
Technician - Yasushi "Mayuge" Horiuchi
Cover Design - Hidetake Awano
Cover Coordinate - Mitsuaki Takeda
Photograph - Ryosuke Takashi
Cover Graphics - I-S PHOTO INC.

Release history

References
 『BAND SCORE CASIOPEA FULL COLORS』 1991 Rittor Music, Inc.

External links

LD 

MOTION PICTURE FROM FULL COLORS is the video work by the jazz fusion group Casiopea released in 1991. At the same time, album Full Colors was also released.
It was released on LaserDisc single and VHS.
It re-released on DVD as part of the way of CASIOPEA on June 23, 2004.

Commentary 
Three songs promotion video and making video are included.

Track listing

Release history

External links
 LaserDisk Database Casiopea: Motion Pictures from Full Colors

References

1991 albums
Casiopea albums
1991 video albums
Casiopea video albums